General Arbuthnot may refer to:

Bingham Arbuthnot (1803–1867), British East India Company major general
Charles George Arbuthnot (1824–1899), British Army lieutenant general
Charles George James Arbuthnot (1801–1870), British Army general
Dalrymple Arbuthnot (1867–1941), British Army brigadier general
Hugh Arbuthnot (British Army officer) (1780–1868), British Army general
Keith Arbuthnott, 15th Viscount of Arbuthnott (1897–1966), British Army major general
Robert Arbuthnot (British Army officer) (1773–1853), British Army lieutenant general
Thomas Arbuthnot (1776–1849), British Army lieutenant general